Bronson John Webb (born 20 February 1983) is a British actor.

Career 
Webb has had supporting roles in Harry Potter and the Prisoner of Azkaban (2005), The Dark Knight (2008) from the Batman franchise, Robin Hood (2010), and Pirates of the Caribbean: On Stranger Tides (2011). In roles with more visibility, he has played Emilio, a kidnapper in The Lives of the Saints (2006), and Tony the sidekick in Pusher (2012). Webb also plays Will, a central character in "Winter Is Coming", the first episode of HBO's Game of Thrones.

Selected filmography

References

External links

21st-century English male actors
Living people
English male television actors
English male stage actors
English male film actors
Male actors from London
1983 births